Manning Archeological Site is a historic archaeological site located near Cayce, Lexington County, South Carolina. The site contains evidence of prehistoric Indian occupation beginning with the Paleo-Indian (9,500 BC) period though the historic Indians of the 1700s.

It was listed on the National Register of Historic Places in 1978.

References

Archaeological sites on the National Register of Historic Places in South Carolina
Buildings and structures in Lexington County, South Carolina
National Register of Historic Places in Lexington County, South Carolina